The Rooftop may refer to:

 The Rooftop (album), a 2009 album by Webstar and Jim Jones
 The Rooftop (film), a 2013 Taiwanese musical film

See also 
 Rooftop (disambiguation)